Chi Lupi (Chi Lup, χ Lupi, χ Lup) is a spectroscopic binary star in the constellation of Lupus.  It has an apparent visual magnitude of approximately 3.957.  The primary star in the binary is a mercury-manganese star of spectral type B9.5V; the secondary is a metallic-lined star of type A2Vm.

This system is a proper motion member of the Upper Scorpius sub-group in the
Scorpius–Centaurus OB association,
the nearest such co-moving association of massive stars to the Sun.
The Upper Scorpius subgroup contains thousands of stars with an average age of 11 million years old at mean distances of 145 parsecs (470 light years).

References

Lupus (constellation)
B-type main-sequence stars
A-type main-sequence stars
141556
Lupi, Chi
Lupi, 5
077634
Spectroscopic binaries
Upper Scorpius
5883
Durchmusterung objects